The Bootleg Series Vol. 17: Fragments – Time Out of Mind Sessions (1996–1997) is a compilation album by American singer-songwriter Bob Dylan. The 15th installment in the ongoing Bob Dylan Bootleg Series, it was released by Legacy Records on January 27, 2023. The compilation includes a remix of the original Time Out of Mind album, outtakes, alternate versions and live recordings. The release comes in a two-CD standard edition and a five-disc box set. In addition to the CD releases, a 4-LP and 10-LP were released.

Reception

In Der Spiegel, Max Dax gave a positive review of this album, writing that the new remix unleashes "the full musical power" of Dylan at this stage in his career. The editors of AllMusic scored this album three out of five stars, with reviewer Stephen Thomas Erlewine noting that Daniel Lanois' original production on Time Out of Mind had a "murkiness of the album nagged at Dylan" and that the recording are a chronicle of Dylan attempting to find the right sound for these songs repeatedly. Pitchfork rated this an 8.6, calling it the Best New Reissue of the week, with reviewer Jayson Greene praising the structure and relevance of this release, noting that this entry in the Bootleg Series both "subverts received knowledge" and "magnifies legends" about Dylan's often-mythologized career and songwriting.

Track listing 
All tracks are written by Bob Dylan unless otherwise mentioned.

Standard edition

Charts

See also 
The Bootleg Series Vol. 8: Tell Tale Signs: Rare and Unreleased 1989–2006 – 2008 compilation that first featured outtakes and demos from the Time Out of Mind sessions

References 

2023 compilation albums
Bob Dylan compilation albums
Columbia Records compilation albums